International Financial Center Jakarta  is a complex of office buildings at Karet, Setiabudi in South Jakarta. 

International Financial Tower 2 is the tallest among the buildings in the complex. The tower is 213.2 meter tall, has 49 floor above & 6 floor below the ground.
The tower is certified the highest as Green Mark Platinum by Green Mark Gold Building and Construction Authority of Singapore (BCA) from Singapore.It is redeveloped at the place of previously 10 storied tower 1, which has now total floor area of approximately 61,300.  The 18-storey Tower 1 will be redeveloped into a 49-storey office tower with a GFA of about 86,300 sm and is scheduled for completion by 2020.

See also
List of tallest buildings in Indonesia
List of tallest buildings in Jakarta

References

Buildings and structures in Jakarta
Skyscraper office buildings in Indonesia
Towers in Indonesia
Office buildings completed in 2016